2K3 may refer to:

 the year 2003
 NBA 2K3, 2002 video game
 NCAA College Basketball 2K3, 2002 video game
 NCAA College Football 2K3, 2002 video game
 NFL 2K3, 2002 video game
 NHL 2K3, 2002 video game
 World Series Baseball 2K3, 2003 video game